The Lithuanian A Lyga 2006 was the 17th season of top-tier football in Lithuania. The season started on 15 April 2006 and ended on 12 November 2006. 10 teams participated with FBK Kaunas winning the championship.

League standings

Results

First half of season

Second half of season

Relegation play-off 

|}

Top goalscorers

See also 
 2006 LFF Lyga

References 

LFF Lyga seasons
1
Lith
Lith